The Colonel is a 2006 French-Belgian film directed by Laurent Herbiet, based on a novel by Francis Zamponi.

Plot 
France, 1993. The retired Colonel Raoul Duplan is shot in his home. As the police are baffled, young army officer Galois is brought to help the investigation. Shortly thereafter she receives a letter containing some diary pages of a lieutenant Guy Rossi who served in 1955 in the Algerian war under the command of Duplan and disappeared in 1957 under mysterious circumstances.
Every day Galois receives a continuation of the diary in which Rossi describes in detail his ambivalent relationship to Duplan and his dirty methods. As she reads the diary the film flashes back to black-and-white scenes of Rossis' experiences.  Rossi witness torture and public executions, and finds himself torn between wanting peace and disgust at the brutal methods being employed to secure it.  Rossi inadvertently reveals information to a friend sympathetic to the rebels which may have led to the murder of a shopkeeper who was providing information to the French army.  Ordered by Duplan to command a firing squad, he resolves to disobey his superior's orders.  It is revealed he left the diary with the friend with the intended final recipient being his father because he feared for his life.  A recent appearance on TV of Col. Duplan prompted his friend to finally deliver the letter to Rossis' father, who, when confronted by Galois readily reveals he has been the one sending the diary and that he committed the murder because Duplan expressed no remorse for his son's murder, Duplan justifying himself by saying Rossi was a traitor.  The film ends somewhat ambiguously as Galois, as an army officer, lacks the authority to arrest the elder Rossi, and while driving back from the interview, seems moved by the experience and decides to get lunch with her commanding officer instead of immediately returning to the office.

Cast 

 Olivier Gourmet : Colonel Raoul Duplan
 Robinson Stévenin : Lieutenant Guy Rossi
 Cécile de France : Lieutenant Galois
 Charles Aznavour : Father Rossi
 Bruno Solo : Commandant Reidacher
 Eric Caravaca : René Ascensio
 Guillaume Gallienne : The sub-prefect
 Georges Siatidis : Captain Roger
 Thierry Hancisse : Commissaire Quitard
 Jacques Boudet : The Senator-Mayor
 Wladimir Yordanoff : The Chief of Staff
 Bruno Lochet : Schmeck
 Hervé Pauchon : Commandant de Villedieu
 Christophe Rouzaud : General Bibendum
 Philippe Chevallier : The director
 Abdelmalek Kadi : Inspector Belkacem
 Olga Grumberg : Françoise
 Samir Guesmi : Ali
 Ahmed Benaissa : Ben Miloud
 Xavier Maly : Father Jeantet
 Marie Kremer : Thérèse
 Franck Pitiot : Caporal Arnoul
 Alexandre Gavras : Inspector Bayard
 Rabah Loucif : Omar Bouamari

References

External links 
 

2006 films
2000s French-language films
Films set in the French colonial empire
2006 directorial debut films